Langstaff Secondary School (LSS) is a public high school in Richmond Hill, Ontario, Canada.

Facilities/layout
In 2003, the school underwent a major renovation and doubled in size.

Academics

French Immersion
Langstaff Secondary School is one of six schools in the York District to offer a French Immersion curriculum. Upon successful completion of the requisite French Immersion courses, students are eligible to receive a French Immersion Certificate.

Advanced Placement
Langstaff Secondary School offers the Advanced Placement programme to its students. The school offers AP courses in Science (Chemistry, Biology and Physics), English, French and Math (Advanced functions, Calculus and Vectors). Like other AP programmes, students who complete the Grade 12 AP courses are eligible to write the AP exam.

Athletics
In 2007, Langstaff established a varsity men's hockey team. They were undefeated in their inaugural season and won the YRAA Tier II championships.

In 2017, the Langstaff junior boys basketball team went 13-0 the entire season and won the playoffs, undefeated, winning the YRAA Tier II championship.

In 2019, the Langstaff Senior boys basketball team won the Maple Blue n' Blue Senior Classic tournament.

Notable alumni
 Melissa Lantsman, Member of Parliament for Thornhill
 Jonathan D'Aversa, hockey player for the Pittsburgh Penguins
 Gillian Ferrari, hockey player
 Tracy Moore, TV personality
 Poorya Nazari, professional poker player
 Theo Peckham, former hockey player for the Edmonton Oilers
 Justin Trottier, political candidate, public speaker and media personality
 Austin Delany, News broadcaster with CTV news
 Beatrice Vaisman, News reporter and anchor at CP24

See also
List of high schools in Ontario

References

External links
Official web site of Langstaff Secondary School
York Region District School Board homepage

High schools in the Regional Municipality of York
Education in Richmond Hill, Ontario